Milan Uhde (born 28 July 1936 in Brno) is a Czech playwright and politician. He is a member of the Civic Democratic Party.

Uhde previously worked at a literary journal, but the publication was banned in 1972. He signed the human rights Charter 77 which further worsened his relations with the authorities.

Uhde served in the Parliament of Czechoslovakia and the Czech National Council from 1990 until 1992. He was appointed Chairman in 1992. He also served as Speaker of the Chamber of Deputies of the Czech Republic from 1993 to 1996. He returned to his writing career in 1998.

References

External links

 Centomag
 Prague Tribune

|-

1936 births
Living people
Charter 77 signatories
Czech male poets
20th-century Czech dramatists and playwrights
20th-century Czech poets
Czech male dramatists and playwrights
Politicians from Brno
Civic Democratic Party (Czech Republic) MPs
Recipients of Medal of Merit (Czech Republic)
Masaryk University alumni
Freedom Union – Democratic Union politicians
Civic Forum politicians
Civic Democratic Party (Czech Republic) Government ministers
Speakers of the Chamber of Deputies (Czech Republic)
Members of the Chamber of Deputies of the Czech Republic (1992–1996)
Members of the Chamber of Deputies of the Czech Republic (1996–1998)
Writers from Brno